The Infrastructure Technology Institute (ITI) is a federally funded transportation research center at Northwestern University in Evanston, Illinois. ITI was founded by an $18 million grant in 1992, and in 1998 was named one of six "top tier" university transportation centers in the nation and awarded a $12 million, six-year federal grant through the Transportation Equity Act for the 21st Century.
 A primary focus of the work of ITI is structural health monitoring as well as advanced structural modeling methods. Currently, Professor Joseph Schofer is serving as a director of the institute.

References

External links
 ITI homepage

Northwestern University
University and college laboratories in the United States
United States Department of Transportation
Infrastructure in the United States
Research institutes established in 1992
1992 establishments in Illinois